Hugh William Mackay, 14th Lord Reay, Baron Mackay (19 July 1937 – 10 May 2013), was a British politician and Conservative member of the House of Lords. He was the only male Lord of Parliament to sit in the House of Lords following the abolition of the automatic right of all British hereditary peers to sit in the House of Lords in 1999, the only female being The Lady Saltoun.

Biography
Lord Reay was the only son of Aeneas Alexander Mackay, 13th Lord Reay. He was educated at Eton College and Christ Church, Oxford.

He succeeded to the title upon his father's death in 1963, sitting in the House of Lords first as a cross-bencher, then as a Liberal, and finally, from 1972, as a Conservative. He championed causes from the abolition of capital punishment to restrictions on onshore wind farms.

He sat as an appointed Member of the European Parliament from 1973 until the first elections in 1979. He also served as a delegate to the Council of Europe, living at the family's Dutch estates in Ophemert.

He subsequently was appointed as a House of Lords whip in 1989 by Margaret Thatcher. In 1991, he was moved by her successor, John Major, to the Department of Trade and Industry as a Parliamentary Under Secretary of State, but he left the government at the 1992 general election.

With the passage of the House of Lords Act 1999, Lord Reay along with almost all other hereditary peers lost his automatic right to sit in the House of Lords, however, he was one of the 92 elected hereditary peers to remain in the House of Lords pending completion of House of Lords reform.

Lord Reay was the hereditary Clan Chief of Clan Mackay, and Lord of Ophemert and Zennewijnen in the Netherlands.

Family
Lord Reay was married twice. With his first wife Tessa Keswick, (née the Honourable Annabel Terese Fraser), a daughter of Lord Lovat (she is now wife of Henry Keswick), he had two sons and one daughter. With his second wife Victoria Isabella, youngest daughter of the late 1st Baron Bruntisfield, he had two daughters.

He was succeeded by his elder son, Aeneas Mackay, Master of Reay (born 20 March 1965), a banker, who married, on 14 January 2010, Mia Ruulio, elder daughter of Markus Ruulio of Helsinki. His heir is his son, the Honourable Alexander Shimi Markus Mackay (born 21 April 2010).

Links
Profile , mapsstatsandpolitics.talktalk.net; accessed 26 March 2016. 
 Profile, thepeerage.com; accessed 26 March 2016.

References

1937 births
2013 deaths
Alumni of Christ Church, Oxford
Conservative Party (UK) Baronesses- and Lords-in-Waiting
Conservative Party (UK) MEPs
Crossbench hereditary peers
Liberal Party (UK) hereditary peers
Mackay, Hugh
MEPs for the United Kingdom 1973–1979
People educated at Eton College
Lords Reay
Hereditary peers elected under the House of Lords Act 1999